Minuscule 103 (in the Gregory-Aland numbering), ΟΘ28 (Soden), is a Greek minuscule manuscript of the New Testament, on parchment leaves. Palaeographically it has been assigned to the 12th century. The manuscript has complex contents.

Formerly it was labelled by 100a and 115p.

Description 

The codex contains a complete text of the Acts, Catholic epistles, and Pauline epistles on 333 parchment leaves (size ) with a catena.

The order of books: Acts of the Apostles, Catholic epistles, and Pauline epistles. The order of Pauline epistles is unusual: Romans, Hebrews, Colossians, 1-2 Thessalonians, Philipians, 1-2 Timothy, Titus, Philemon, Ephesians, Galatians, and 1-2 Corinthians.

Text 

The Greek text of the codex is a representative of the Byzantine text-type. According to Kurt Aland in Acts it supports 65 times the Byzantine text against the original, 6 times the original against the Byzantine, 25 times agrees with both. It has 9 independent or distinctive readings. Aland placed it in Category V.

In Acts 8:39 instead of πνεῦμα κυρίου (spirit of the Lord) it has unusual textual variant  (the Holy Spirit fell on the eunuch, and an angel of the Lord caught up Philip) supported by Codex Alexandrinus and several minuscule manuscripts: 94, 307, 322, 323, 385, 453, 467, 945, 1739, 1765, 1891, 2298, 36a, itp, vg, syrh.

History 

The manuscript was examined by Matthaei.

Formerly it was labelled by 100a and 115p. Gregory in 1908 gave for it number 103.

It is currently housed at the State Historical Museum (V. 96, S. 347), at Moscow.

See also 

 List of New Testament minuscules
 Biblical manuscript
 Textual criticism

References

Further reading 

 

Greek New Testament minuscules
12th-century biblical manuscripts